Liocarcinus zariquieyi is a species of crab that lives in the Mediterranean Sea. It is very similar to Liocarcinus pusillus, and was for a long time confused with that species.

Taxonomic history
The species now known as Liocarcinus zariquieyi was first recognised by Bruno Parisi in 1915. He realised that the species then known as "Portunus pusillus" comprised two separate taxa. The species was recognised during the revision of two species originally described in the genus Portunus by Parisi, "Portunus pusillus" and "Portunus parvulus". Parisi mistakenly asserted, however, that of his two species, "P. parvulus" was the new one. In fact, his "P. pusillus" was the new species. This was recognised by the Dutch carcinologist Lipke Holthuis in 1958, but he was aware that Gordon was preparing a revision, and continued to use Parisi's names. In 1968, Gordon published a paper in the journal Crustaceana, separating "Macropipus zariquieyi" from the species that by then had become "Macropipus pusillus" (now Liocarcinus pusillus). The specific epithet  commemorates Ricardo Zariquiey Alvarez, who had recognised the two species in Spanish waters, and provided material to Gordon that allowed her to describe the new species.

Distribution
Liocarcinus zariquieyi is found in the Mediterranean Sea and the Canary Islands. A single specimen, in the collections of Alfred Merle Norman, purports to be from the east coast of Great Britain.

Description
It differs from other species in the "pusillus group" (Liocarcinus maculatus and Liocarcinus pusillus) in having a smooth carapace. Also, the teeth on the antero-lateral margin of the carapace are all rounded at the tip, and the fourth is larger than the fifth, and the carpus (4th segment) is shorter than the propodus (6th segment) on the third and fourth pereiopods in L. zariquieyi but not L. pusillus of L. maculatus.

References

Portunoidea
Crustaceans of the Atlantic Ocean
Crustaceans described in 1968